Abu Sulayman Jazairi (died 14 May 2008) was a senior leader of al Qaeda. He is originally from Algeria and was killed in Pakistan.

Operations
Jazairi was known as a weapons expert and was trained with planning attacks on Western targets. He was involved in training al Qaeda terrorists.

Death
Jazairi and several other men, were killed by a drone attack launched from a Predator UAV, in Damadola, Bajaur District, on 14 May 2008.

References

Year of birth missing
2008 deaths
Algerian al-Qaeda members
Assassinated al-Qaeda leaders
Deaths by United States drone strikes in Pakistan
Algerian expatriates in Pakistan